The vibrational partition function traditionally refers to the component of the canonical partition function resulting from the vibrational degrees of freedom of a system. The vibrational partition function is only well-defined in model systems where the vibrational motion is relatively uncoupled with the system's other degrees of freedom.

Definition
For a system (such as a molecule or solid) with uncoupled vibrational modes the vibrational partition function is defined by

For an isolated molecule of n atoms, the number of vibrational modes (i.e. values of j) is 3n − 5 for linear molecules and 3n − 6 for non-linear ones. In crystals, the vibrational normal modes are commonly known as phonons.

Approximations

Quantum harmonic oscillator
The most common approximation to the vibrational partition function uses a model in which the vibrational eigenmodes or normal modes of the system are considered to be a set of uncoupled quantum harmonic oscillators. It is a first order approximation to the partition function which allows one to calculate the contribution of the vibrational degrees of freedom of molecules towards its thermodynamic variables. A quantum harmonic oscillator has an energy spectrum characterized by:

is the angular frequency of the j'''th mode.  Using this approximation we can derive a closed form expression for the vibrational partition function.

where  is total vibrational zero point energy of the system.

Often the wavenumber,  with units of cm−1 is given instead of the angular frequency of a vibrational mode and also often misnamed frequency. One can convert to angular frequency by using  where c'' is the speed of light in vacuum. In terms of the vibrational wavenumbers we can write the partition function as

It is convenient to define a characteristic vibrational temperature 

where  is experimentally determined for each vibrational mode by taking a spectrum or by calculation. By taking the zero point energy as the reference point to which other energies are measured, the expression for the partition function becomes

References

See also
 Partition function (mathematics)

Partition functions